On the Other Hand is an album by the Dominican musician Michel Camilo, released in 1990 under the Epic Records label.

Critical reception

Newsday wrote that Camilo's "classical-jazz-Latin synthesis is one of the more avant-garde statements by a contemporary pianist... Rather than simply pumping up jazz tunes with Latin rhythmic structures, he speaks in several musical languages at once, prefiguring a multicultural future." The Globe and Mail noted that "as impressive a pianist as Camilo clearly is, he startles not by what he plays, but by how: chop, chop, chop—quick, clean and on the flashy side of frantic."

Track listing

Personnel 
Michel Camilo – Piano
Chris Hunter – Saxophone 
Ralph Bowen – Saxophone 
Michael Mossman - Trumpet 
Cliff Almond - Drums 
Michael Bowie - Bass 
D.K. Dyson - Vocals 
Sammy Figueroa - Percussion, Congas

References

External links 
 Michel Camilo Discography

Michel Camilo albums
1990 albums
Latin jazz albums by Dominican Republic artists